Bruno Brizzi (born 2 November 1933) is a retired Swiss football midfielder.

References

1933 births
Living people
Swiss men's footballers
FC Winterthur players
FC Zürich players
FC St. Gallen players
Association football midfielders
Switzerland international footballers
Footballers from Zürich